Franz Xaver Fieber (Prague, 1 March 1807 – Chrudim, 22 February 1872 ) was a German botanist and entomologist.

He was the son of Franz Anton Fieber and Maria Anna née Hantsehl. He studied economics, management science and modern languages at the Czech Technical University in Prague from 1824 to 1828. He began work in finance (civil service) before becoming a magistrate in Chrudim in Bohemia.

Fieber was a Member of the Deutsche Akademie der Naturforscher Leopoldina. He was the author of "Synopsis der europäischen Orthopteren" (1854), Die europäischen Hemiptera (1860), and numerous other publications on insects. He worked notably on insect wings. As well as Hemiptera, he studied Orthoptera.

References
 Allen G. Debus (dir.) (1968). World Who’s Who in Science. A Biographical Dictionary of Notable Scientists from Antiquity to the Present. Marquis-Who's Who (Chicago) : xvi + 1855 p.

1807 births
1872 deaths
Hemipterists
Scientists from Prague
19th-century German botanists
German entomologists
German Bohemian people
Czech Technical University in Prague alumni